Jan Kazimierz Kauzik (8 February 1860, Warsaw - 18 September 1930, Warsaw) was a Polish painter and art teacher.

Life and works
From 1882 to 1885, he studied with Alexander von Wagner at the Academy of Fine Arts, Munich.

After returning to Warsaw, he became a Professor at the drawing school. From 1903, he also lectured at the Museum of Industry and Agriculture. From 1907 to 1908, he served as a museum custodian.

His style and content tended to be conservative; focusing on portraits, genre scenes and landscapes. From 1883 to 1909, he held numerous exhibits at his alma mater, the Society, and at the Kraków Society of Friends of Fine Arts.

In 1888, he married Stanisławą Leontyną Jezierską (1871-1947). They had four children; Janinę (1889-1949),  (1891-1959), who became a noted lawyer and politician, Eugeniusza (1892-1944) and Leokadię (1895-1944).

He was buried in the family tomb at the Powązki Cemetery.

References

Further reading 
 Jerzy Malinowski, Malarstwo polskie XIX wieku, DiG, 2003 
 Biography @ the iPSB

External links

1860 births
1930 deaths
Polish painters
Polish male painters
Polish portrait painters
Genre painters
Artists from Warsaw
Academy of Fine Arts, Munich alumni